Shumete Gizaw is an Ethiopian, and the former Director General of the Information Network Security Administration (INSA)-ኢንሳ. He was the former Chief of Staff of Prime Minister Abiy Ahmed, State Minister of Science and Technology of Ethiopia. He also graduated from Addis Ababa University and has earned his PhD and he is currently an Associate Professor of Environmental Planning and Development.He is a researcher and has published many scientific and research articles in international & reputable journals. Besides his rich experiences of teaching in the University, he has also served in University leadership including Dean and Academic & Research Vice President of Dilla University from 2013 through 2016. He is motivational speaker mainly on the 'Pyramid of Contribution'. Currently he is working in "Organization of Educational Cooperation". Many tagged him with "Servant and Transformational Leader" .

References 

Living people
Year of birth missing (living people)
Ethiopian government officials
Government ministers of Ethiopia
Addis Ababa University alumni

1.	http://innovation-africa.com/2016/confirmed-delegations/
2.	https://www.iaea.org/sites/default/files/18/09/gc62-ethiopia-statement.pdf
3.	https://semonegna.com/tag/shumete-gizaw/
4.	https://semonegna.com/emost-iaea-signed-country-programme-framework-cpf/iaea-and-ethiopia-signed-country-programme-framework/
5.	https://en.wikipedia.org/wiki/Shumete_Gizaw
6.	http://www.aau.edu.et/cds/center-for-food-security-studies/dr-shumete-gizaw/
7.	https://www.amazon.com/Books-Shumete-Gizaw-Woldeamanuel/s?rh=n%3A283155%2Cp_27%3AShumete+Gizaw+Woldeamanuel
8.	https://africanews.space/all-about-the-ongoing-african-initiative-for-planetary-and-space-science-international-workshop/
9.	https://archive.uneca.org/stories/ethiopia%E2%80%99s-digital-platform-guiding-investors-country-launched-addis-ababa
10.	https://unctad.org/meeting/cstd-side-event-start-green-goals-role-start-ups-sustainable-development
11.	https://mainichi.jp/english/articles/20200323/p2g/00m/0fe/025000c
12.	https://addisstandard.com/news-the-issue-of-digital-sovereignty-a-matter-of-national-sovereignty-insa/
13.	http://www.aau.edu.et/blog/curriculum-validation-workshop-on-food-security-and-disaster-risk-management-development-programs/
14.	https://afrikanheroes.com/tag/shumete-gizaw/